Paduraksa, also known as kori is a type of gateway covered with towering roof that can be found in the island of Java and Bali, Indonesia. This architectural feature is commonly found in buildings from the classical Hindu-Buddhist period of Indonesia. Paduraksa marks the threshold into the most sacred space (the inner sanctum) within a religious compound, a cemetery, or a palace. In Balinese architecture, an elaborately decorated towering paduraksa is often built as the temple's most imposing structure.

Form

A paduraksa is basically a gateway in the form of a candi. The structure consists of three parts: the base, where a flight of steps is located; the body where the entrance opening is located; and the crown, with its stepped profile characteristic of a candi. The entrance opening is sometimes equipped with a door made of finely carved wood.

One of the oldest surviving paduraksa gates is Bajang Ratu in Trowulan, an elegant red-brick paduraksa gate dating from the mid-14th century Majapahit. The Bajang Ratu gate is adorned with a bas-reliefs depicting the story of Sri Tanjung and Ramayana. The form of the structure is tall and slender, rising to a height of 16.5 metres and displaying intricate relief decoration, especially on the roof section. 

While the basic form of a paduraksa is a stepped candi, it can be heavily decorated with ornaments, figures, and symbols. In Bali, the crown of the paduraksa is decorated with flame-like ornaments and celestial figures. The menacing head of the bhoma or fierce kala is often carved over the opening, while a lion-like effigies, or a pair of fierce giants of dvarapalas, guard the sides of the entrance. Both menacing figures of kala's head and dvarapalas door guardians are believed to have protective property; to repel and drive away evil spirits from entering the compound. 

A paduraksa in the Islamic cemetery complex of Sendang Duwur contains a mysterious wing-like feature thought to represent the wings of the meru; this might be associated with the celestial bird garuda.

Classical Javanese and Balinese Hindu temple

Paduraksa and candi bentar (another gateway feature) are integral features of a Balinese Hindu temple architecture, and possibly the classical Javanese Hindu temple. Both gateways mark the threshold between different level of sanctity within a temple compound. In Bali, a candi bentar marks the boundary between the outer world with the outer realm of the Hindu temple, the nista mandala ("outer sanctum"), while the paduraksa marks the boundary between the madya mandala ("middle sanctum") with the innermost and the most sacred utama mandala ("main sanctum"). 

In Balinese temple architecture, a major temple usually has triple paduraksa gates, the main largest and tallest paduraksa, flanked with two smaller ones. Daily devotees and casual visitors usually use the side doors, while the main door is kept locked, except during religious festivals.  In Bali, the paduraksa central gate is reserved for the priests and the gods.

Origin and evolution

The paduraksa is a classical Indonesian adaptation of the classical Indian gopuram. The early form of a Javanese roofed gateway can be found in a couple of 8th to 9th-century temple complexes in Central Java, e.g. Prambanan, Plaosan, and Ratu Boko. In the later period, these gateways took a more slender form. Reliefs showing a candi bentar and paduraksa have been discovered in 13th-century Candi Jago in East Java. The 13th- to 14th-century paduraksa of East Java, such as those found from the Hindu period of Singhasari and Majapahit, looks identical with the Balinese paduraksa. In the archaeological site of Trowulan – the 14th-century capital of the Majapahit empire – a paduraksa named Bajang Ratu (Javanese "dwarf/defect monarch"), is the oldest paduraksa that still stands. Bajang Ratu paduraksa entrance contains round holes, indicating that a double-leaf door once existed here. 

The paduraksa is still widely used upon the arrival of the Islam period in the 15th century. The name  is usually chosen for a paduraksa which is used for non-Hindu purposes. Many kraton (palace) complexes of Islamic Java uses  within its complex, e.g. within the Kraton Ngayogyakarta Hadiningrat of Yogyakarta Sultanate, Kraton Kasepuhan and Kanoman of Cirebon Sultanate and the ruined Kraton Kaibon of Banten Sultanate. The Sendang Duwur cemetery complex has two  with wing-like architectural form, which is thought to represent a winged Meru.

See also

 Architecture of Indonesia
 Gopuram, gates in Indian Hindu temples

References

Cited works

Architecture in Indonesia
Archaeological sites in Indonesia

Javanese culture
Balinese culture
Cultural Properties of Indonesia